Grrr is the second studio album by South African musician Hugh Masekela. It was recorded in New York City and released in 1966 via Mercury Records. Grrr was re-released on LP in 1968 on Wing/Mercury labels as Hugh Masekela and on CD in 2003 on Verve label. On this record, he seamlessly fuses jazz ideas with the rhythmically complex South African music known as Mbaqanga.

Reception
A reviewer of Dusty Groove wrote: "Great early work from Hugh Masekela! The record features all instrumental tracks – all short, and with Hugh's funky South African trumpet rolling over the top! The overall sound is a lot less slick than on some of his late 60s hits – and you can really hear his roots in the South African jazz scene on this one. The tracks are spare, with a strong jazz component – and dancing piano lines behind the raspy and soulful trumpet and trombone solos that dominate much of the record."

Track listing

Personnel
Arranging – Hugh Masekela (tracks: 1 2 3 4 5 6 7 9 10), Jonas Gwangwa (tracks: 8)
Producer – Ed Townsend
Editor – Luchi DeJesus
Photography – Bob Eimore & Associates, Inc.
Photography – Bob Prokup

Uncredited personnel
Guitar – Eric Gale
Piano – Larry Willis
Saxophone – Morris Goldberg 
Trombone – Jonas Gwangwa
Tuba – Howard St. John
The uncredited personnel is identified by Hugh Masekela in his autobiography Still Grazing: The Musical Journey of Hugh Masekela (Crown 2004).

References

External links

 

1966 albums
Mercury Records albums
Hugh Masekela albums